"Let the Redeemed" is a single by American Christian singer-songwriter Josh Baldwin that was released via Bethel Music on July 19, 2019. The song was written by Bobby Strand, Ethan Hulse, Josh Baldwin and Kalley Heiligenthal.

Background
On June 10, 2019, Bethel Music had announced via Daily Play MPE that "Let the Redeemed" would be Josh Baldwin's next single, with the song slated to impact Christian radio on July 19, 2019. On July 18, 2019, Josh Baldwin announced on social media that he would be releasing a new song the following day. The song was released on July 19, 2019.

Baldwin shared the story behind the song in a video uploaded to YouTube. He shared that the song was inspired by The Passion Translation of Psalm 107:2 which says "Tell the world how he broke through and delivered you from the power of darkness."
He also added: "I feel like the power that reaches the people the most is our testimony, the power of our testimony. There’s such hope that comes out when we share what the Lord has done in us with other people. They can see where you’ve been and where you are now and how the Lord redeemed you. The song that probably is the most powerful on earth is the song of the redeemed. And that’s what this song really is."

Composition

Music videos
The live music video of "Let the Redeemed" performed by Josh Baldwin, recorded at the Heaven Come Conference 2019 at the Microsoft Theatre in Los Angeles, California was published on July 19, 2019, on Bethel Music's YouTube channel. The acoustic music video of the song was released on Apple Music on the same day.

Track listing

Charts

Weekly charts

Year-end charts

Release history

References

External links
  on PraiseCharts
 

2019 singles
2019 songs
Contemporary Christian songs
Songs written by Ethan Hulse